Nicko Williams (born 24 October 1989) is a Grenadian footballer who has played as a defender for Waterhouse F.C., Hard Rock and the Grenada national football team.

Club career
Williams has played for Hard Rock in Grenada and Waterhouse in Jamaica.

International career

International goals
Scores and results list Grenada's goal tally first.

References

External links

1989 births
Living people
Association football defenders
Grenadian footballers
Grenada international footballers